

Incumbents

Events

January 
 January 20 — to President of Latvia Raimonds Vējonis was performed heart surgery

August
August 5–21 - Latvia competed in the 2016 Summer Olympics in Rio de Janeiro, Brazil

December 
 December 3–11 — 2016 Men's World Floorball Championships take place in Latvia.

Deaths
January 4 — Rūsiņš Mārtiņš Freivalds, computer scientist and mathematician (b. 1942)
April 9 — Juris Ekmanis, President of Latvian Academy of Sciences (b. 1941)
April 22 — Ojārs Grīnbergs, singer (b. 1942)
August 22 — Jānis Reinis, actor (b. 1960)
November 29 — Ruta Šaca-Marjaša, lawyer, writer, poet, and politician (b. 1927)

 
2010s in Latvia
Years of the 21st century in Latvia
Latvia
Latvia